St. David's Island is one of the main islands of the British Overseas Territory of Bermuda. It is located in the far north of the territory, one of the two similarly sized islands that make up the majority of St. George's Parish.

The island was originally  in size. This was later renamed as Kindley Air Force Base and USNAS Bermuda, which occupied more than half the island's land under a 99-year lease.

The base was closed in 1995 and returned to Bermuda. Those parts of the base required for operation of the airfield, along with the Civil air Terminal, became the Bermuda International Airport (subsequently renamed L.F. Wade International Airport by the PLP government). Cooper's Island is now attached physically to southeast St. David's, although the two islands are still widely regarded as if they were separate entities.

The island was named by British colonists in honour of Saint David, the patron saint of Wales, as the similarly sized St. George's Island, to the north, had been named for the patron saint of England. The two islands are separated by two bodies of water - Ferry Reach in the south-west and St. George's Harbor in the north-east. St. David's is separated from the Bermudian mainland by the waters of Castle Harbor in the south, but is joined to it by road via The Causeway.

Notable features of the island include St. David's Head, Bermuda's easternmost point, and the nearby St. David's Battery, on Great Head (Great Head is the more prominent of two headlands that comprise St. David's Head); L.F. Wade International Airport; St. David's Lighthouse; and Annie's Bay on Cooper's Island.

St. David's Island is connected to the United States by an Atlantic fiber optic cable known as 360 Americas.

Demographics
As with the rest of Bermuda, the St. David's islanders were established from a diverse group of immigrants, beginning in the 17th century. These included indentured servants from England, Ireland and Scotland, Spanish-speaking Blacks from the West Indies, and Black African and Native American slaves. Although hundreds of Native American slaves were absorbed into the total population of Bermuda, some Bermudians have long referred to  St. David's islanders (disparagingly) as 'Mohawks'. Only two Mohawk boys were recorded as having been imported to Bermuda following Dutch-Mohawk wars. To many English in the late 17th and 18th centuries, however, the Iroquoian-speaking Mohawk were the best-known Native American people, as they were a powerful tribe in eastern New York. Some English of the period referred to any Native American as a Mohawk.

Today, many St. David's islanders are proud to be called Mohawks. They are actively re-establishing links to the Wampanoag, Pequot and other Algonquian nations that contributed the most members to Bermuda's early settlement. Since the joining of the Island to the rest of Bermuda by the US Army in the 1940s, the former relative isolation of St. David's has ended. The subsequent influx of other Bermudians to what is seen as a more affordable part of Bermuda to buy property, which increased dramatically after the closure of NAS Bermuda in 1995, has eroded the unique character of the islands population. They were once distinguishable by accent and appearance.

Education
St. David's Preschool and Primary School are both on the island.

Clearwater Middle School is also located on St. David's. It opened on September 6, 1997 in the former Roger B. Chaffee High School with 155  students, formerly from the St. George's Secondary School.

References

External links
Bermuda Online
Google Maps satellite photos of Bermunda
 Cape Cod Online: Worlds Rejoined.
 Genealogy.com: Massasoit

 
Islands of Bermuda